Belye Berega is the name of several inhabited localities in Russia.

Urban localities
Belye Berega, Bryansk Oblast, a work settlement under the administrative jurisdiction of Fokinsky City District of Bryansky Urban Administrative Okrug (city of oblast significance) in Bryansk Oblast; 

Rural localities
Belye Berega, Kursk Oblast, a village in Makaropetrovsky Selsoviet of Konyshyovsky District in Kursk Oblast